The 30th Light Dragoons was a cavalry regiment of the British Army. It was raised in October 1794 by Sir John Craven Carden. It was disbanded a short time after on 26 February 1796.

References

Cavalry regiments of the British Army
Dragoon regiments of the British Army
Dragoons
Light Dragoons